Santiago Cartagena Listur (born 1 September 2002) is a Uruguayan professional footballer who plays as a midfielder for Nacional.

Club career
A youth academy graduate of Nacional, Cartagena made his professional debut on 7 September 2020 in a 5–1 league win against Cerro. He came on as an 80th minute substitute for Gabriel Neves and scored his team's final goal in injury time. In April 2021, Cartagena and his Nacional teammate Axel Pérez joined Montevideo City Torque on a loan deal until 31 December 2022.

International career
Cartagena is a current Uruguay youth international. He was part of Uruguay under-17 team which participated at 2019 South American U-17 Championship.

Career statistics

Honours
Nacional
Uruguayan Primera División: 2020

References

External links
 

2002 births
Living people
People from Montevideo
Footballers from Montevideo
Association football midfielders
Uruguayan footballers
Uruguay youth international footballers
Uruguayan Primera División players
Club Nacional de Football players
Montevideo City Torque players